The Bali Museum is a museum of art and history located in Denpasar, Bali, Indonesia.

Description
The museum was built in 1931 by architect P.J. Moojen, near the location of the former royal palace of Denpasar, which had been burnt to the ground during the Dutch intervention in Bali (1906), and used it as a model for its outside walls and courtyards.

There are four main buildings inside the museum, Tabanan displaying theatrical masks and musical instruments, Karangasem sculptures and paintings, Buleleng textiles, and Timur with archeological finds.

It is located on the east side of the central square of Denpasar, Taman Puputan.

See also

 History of Bali
 Museum Pasifika

Notes

References
 Bali and Lombok, Eyewitness Travel, Dorling Kindersley, London, 2007. .

Literature 

Art museums established in 1931
Museums in Bali
History museums in Indonesia
Art museums and galleries in Indonesia
1931 establishments in the Dutch East Indies